Rafael "Rafa" Navarro Rivas (born 10 January 1972) is a Spanish retired footballer who played as a winger, and is a manager.

Playing career
Born in Córdoba, Andalusia, Navarro joined Sevilla FC's youth setup at the age of 17, from Córdoba CF. In 1991, after finishing his formation, he returned to his previous club and was assigned to the main squad in Segunda División B.

For the 1995–96 campaign, Navarro moved straight to La Liga, joining Sporting de Gijón after a one-year spell at Real Jaén in the third division. However, he only featured in two Copa del Rey matches for the side before being loaned to Segunda División side Villarreal CF.

After featuring sparingly, Navarro left the Rojiblancos and moved to Recreativo de Huelva in the third division, in 1997. The following year, he rejoined his first club Córdoba, featuring regularly and helping in the club's promotion to the second level in 1999.

In December 2002, after being deemed surplus to requirements at the Blanquiverdes, Navarro joined AD Ceuta in the third tier. He went on to resume his career mainly in that division in the following years, representing CD Linares, CD Villanueva, Lucena CF and CD Iliturgi; he retired with the latter in 2007, aged 35.

Managerial career
In 2008, shortly after his retirement, Navarro worked as an assistant coach of Córdoba's B and first teams. He left in 2009, but returned in the following year as manager of the youth categories.

In 2013, Navarro took over CA Espeleño in the regional leagues, achieving promotion to Tercera División with the club in 2016. He left the club in June 2018, subsequently returning to Córdoba on 28 September of that year as a director of the youth setup.

On 25 February 2019, Navarro was appointed at the helm of the Blanquiverdes' first team, replacing sacked Curro Torres. He left at the end of the season following their relegation to Segunda B, but remained employed by the club.

Managerial statistics

References

External links

1972 births
Living people
Footballers from Córdoba, Spain
Spanish footballers
Association football wingers
Segunda División players
Segunda División B players
Tercera División players
Córdoba CF players
Real Jaén footballers
Sporting de Gijón players
Villarreal CF players
Recreativo de Huelva players
AD Ceuta footballers
CD Linares players
Lucena CF players
Spanish football managers
Córdoba CF managers